Veronica austriaca, the broadleaf speedwell, large speedwell, Austrian speedwell, or saw-leaved speedwell, is a species of flowering plant in the plantain family Plantaginaceae, native to northern temperate Europe.

The specific epithet austriaca refers to Austria within its native range.

Several cultivars are available, of which the following have gained the Royal Horticultural Society's Award of Garden Merit:- 
V. austriaca subsp. teucrium 'Crater Lake Blue'
V. austriaca subsp. teucrium 'Royal Blue'

References

austriaca
Plants described in 1759
Taxa named by Carl Linnaeus